Florence A. Ballin (1887-1975) was a tennis player from the U.S. She played in the mixed doubles in the early 1900s. She made it to three US Open finals with Bill Tilden.

Career
In 1915 Ballin reached the doubles final at the US Indoor Championships, playing with Molla Bjursted.

Ballin reached the final of the mixed doubles competition at the U.S. National Championships on three occasions (1916, 1917, 1919). Each time she partnered with multiple champion Bill Tilden but they lost all three finals.

In 1919, she wrote a tennis book titled Tennis for Girls.

In 1920, she won the women's championships of New Jersey  and Long Island. She won the women's lawn tennis championship of Pennsylvania and Eastern States in 1922 defeating Anne Townsend in straight sets.

Grand Slam finals

Mixed doubles (3 runners-up)

References

American female tennis players
1887 births
1975 deaths
Tennis people from New York (state)